The Joaquin F. Enriquez Memorial Stadium is a multi-use stadium located inside the Joaquin F. Enriquez Memorial Sports Complex in Zamboanga City, Philippines. The stadium has the capacity of 10,000 people.

Construction of the sports complex started November 1991 and was completed in time for the 1992 Palarong Pambansa.

Ten contractors and 1,500 workers collaborated in order to complete the facility. Total construction cost was a little over P64-million.

In 2005, it was the main venue of the National PRISAA Games which gathered athletes from all over the private schools in the country. In 2007, the PASUC-National Sports Olympics, a competition between public colleges and university varsity teams, was held here.

In 2011, the PRISAA was participated in by more than 400 member colleges and universities from the country's 17 regions. More than 5,000 athletes and officials participated in the games.

The stadium along with the rest of the facilities of the sports complex were damaged following the 2013 Zamboanga City siege by the Moro National Liberation Front. The stadium was used as an evacuation site by people displaced by the attacks and had to undergo renovation from 2016 to 2019.

Sports Events
The stadium hosted the following sporting events:
1968 20th BPISAA- Palarong Pambansa (National Games) 
1992 38th Palarong Pambansa (National Games)
1993 PRISAA National Games
2005 PRISAA National Games
2007 PASUC-National Sports Olympics
2008 PRISAA National Games Championship
2011 PRISAA National Games
2011 Philippine Youth Games – Mindanao Qualifying Leg
2012 WMSU Palaro Games
2012 HipHop competition and Zamboanga National High School West Palaro
2013 zcspc PALARO GAMES .

Gallery

References 

Athletics (track and field) venues in the Philippines
Football venues in the Philippines
Buildings and structures in Zamboanga City
Sports in Zamboanga del Sur
Sports venues completed in 1992
1992 establishments in the Philippines